No-Brainer or No Brainer may refer to:

 "The No-Brainer", the 12th episode of the television series Fringe
 "It's a No-Brainer", an episode of Mr. Show with Bob and David
 "No Brainer" (song), a 2018 song by DJ Khaled
 No Brainer, a 2008 film by Dave, Shelly and Chainsaw
 "No Brainer", an episode of the TV series Gadget & the Gadgetinis